Chester Cooper Conklin (January 11, 1886 – October 11, 1971) was an early American film  comedian who started at Keystone Studios as one of Mack Sennett’s Keystone Cops, often paired with Mack Swain. He appeared in a series of films with Mabel Normand and worked closely with Charlie Chaplin, both in silent and sound films.

Early life
Conklin was born in Oskaloosa, Iowa. One of three children, he grew up in a violent household. When he was eight, his mother was found burned to death in the family garden. Although first judged a suicide, his father, a devoutly religious man who hoped his son would be a minister, was eventually charged with murder, but found not guilty at trial.

Conklin won first prize when he gave a recitation at a community festival. A few years later, he ran away from home after vowing to a friend he would never return, a promise he kept. Heading to Des Moines he found employment as a hotel bellhop, but then moved to Omaha, Nebraska, where his interest in theatre led to a career in comedic acting. In St. Louis, Missouri, he saw a performance by the vaudeville team of Joe Weber and Lew Fields, which prompted Conklin to develop a character based on his boss at the time, a man with a thick accent and a bushy walrus moustache. With this character, Conklin broke into vaudeville, and spent several years touring with various stock companies, doing vaudeville shows and minstrel shows. He also performed as a clown with the Al G. Barnes Wild Animal Show.

Career

After seeing several Mack Sennett comedies while in Venice, California during the 1913 winter break, the 27-year-old Conklin went to Keystone Studios, applied for a job and was hired as a Keystone Kop with a salary of $3 a day. Sennett directed him in his first film, a comedy short titled Hubby's Job.

In 1914, Conklin co-starred with Mabel Normand in a series of films: Mabel's Strange Predicament, Mabel's New Job, Mabel's Busy Day and Mabel at the Wheel.  In that same year he appeared in Making a Living, in which Charlie Chaplin made his film debut. He would go on to make more than a dozen films with Chaplin while at Keystone and the two became lifelong friends. Years later, Conklin would perform with Chaplin in three more feature-length films: City Lights in 1931, Modern Times in 1936, and in 1940's The Great Dictator. During this time, Chaplin kept Conklin on year-round salary.

While at Keystone, Conklin became most famous when he was teamed up with the robust comic Mack Swain to make a series of comedies. With Swain as "Ambrose" and Conklin as the grand mustachioed "Walrus", they performed these roles in several films including The Battle of Ambrose and Walrus and Love, Speed and Thrills, both made in 1915. Beyond these "Ambrose & Walrus" comedies, the two appeared together in twenty-six different films.

In 1920, when Sennett refused to discuss a contract renewal with Conklin and insisted on referring him to an underling, Conklin quit and went to Fox Film Corporation, which had earlier approached him about doing a series of comedy shorts. He also worked at the Famous Players-Lasky Corporation studio. In between, he had a significant role as ZaSu Pitts' father in director Erich von Stroheim's acclaimed 1924 MGM production, Greed, although the part was cut from the film and the footage is now lost, and in 1928 in the Christie Film Company version of Tillie's Punctured Romance with W.C. Fields,  which had nothing to do with the 1914 Chaplin version (in which Conklin had also appeared) aside from the title. Paramount Pictures teamed up Conklin and Fields for a series of comic films between 1927 and 1931.

Conklin made the transition to talkies and, although he would continue to act for another thirty years, age and the shift in moviegoing tastes to more sophisticated comedy saw his roles limited to secondary or smaller parts in shorts, including the Three Stooges shorts Flat Foot Stooges (as a fire chief), Dutiful But Dumb (as a bartender), Three Little Twirps (as a Circus butcher), Phony Express (as a bartender), and Micro-Phonies (as a drunken pianist who answers a song request with "Know it? I wrote it!"). Conklin also appeared in films that appealed to nostalgia for the silent era, such as Hollywood Cavalcade (1939) and The Perils of Pauline (1947). In Soundies musicals, he appeared with other silent-comedy alumni as The Keystone Kops, as well as on the televised This Is Your Life tribute to Mack Sennett. Conklin was part of Preston Sturges' unofficial "stock company" of character actors in the 1940s, appearing in cameo parts in six films written by Sturges.  

In 1957, he was a guest challenger on the TV panel show To Tell The Truth, dressed in his Keystone Kops uniform.

Decline
Conklin's career hit bottom in the 1950s, and he took work as a department-store Santa Claus to make ends meet.  In the 1960s, Conklin was living at the Motion Picture Country Home and Hospital when he fell in love with another patient there, June Gunther. The two got married in Las Vegas in 1965, the fourth marriage for both, they set up housekeeping in Van Nuys, California; the groom was seventy-nine and the bride sixty-five.  Conklin made one last film after that, a Western comedy, A Big Hand for the Little Lady, released in 1966.

Personal life
On April 12, 1933, Conklin was divorced from Minnie V. Conklin after a marriage of 18 years and nine months. He married Margherita Rouse on May 5, 1934, in Hollywood. She died on May 14, 1937. On June 17, 1965, Conklin married former actress June Gunther in Las Vegas.

Conklin died October 11, 1971 in California at the age of 85.

Legacy
For his contribution to the motion picture industry, Conklin has a star on the Hollywood Walk of Fame at 1560 Vine Street.

Selected filmography

 Making a Living (1914 short) - Policeman / Bum (film debut, uncredited)
 Mabel's Strange Predicament (1914 short) - Husband
 Mabel at the Wheel (1914 short) - Mabel's Father
 Caught in a Cabaret (1914 short) - Waiter / Footman (uncredited)
 The Masquerader (1914 short) - Film Actor
 Tillie's Punctured Romance (1914) - Mr. Whoozis / Singing Waiter (uncredited)
 A Bird's A Bird (1915 short) - Husband
 The Love Thief (1916) - Minor Role
 Uncle Tom's Cabin (1918)
 Yankee Doodle in Berlin (1919) - Officer of Death's Head Hussars
 Skirts (1921)
 Tea: With a Kick! (1923) - Jiggs - Taxi Driver
 Desire (1923) - Oland Young
 Anna Christie (1923) - Tommy
 North of Nevada (1924) - Lem Williams
 The Galloping Fish (1924) - Jonah
 The Fire Patrol (1924) - Fireman
 Another Man's Wife (1924) - Rumrunner
 Greed (1924) - 'Popper' Sieppe
 Battling Bunyan (1924) - A Stranger
 One Year to Live (1925) - Froquin
 The Wizard of Oz (1925) - Minor Role (uncredited)
 The Phantom of the Opera (1925) - Orderly (uncredited)
 My Neighbor's Wife (1925) - Cameraman
 Under the Rouge (1925) - Mr. Fleck
 Where Was I? (1925) - Elmer
 The Winding Stair (1925) - Onery
 The Great Jewel Robbery (1925) - Cootie Joe
 The Masked Bride (1925) - Wine Waiter
 A Woman of the World (1925) - Sam Poore
 The Pleasure Buyers (1925) - Burke
 The Great Love (1925) - Perkins
 Behind the Front (1926) - Scottie
 Fascinating Youth (1926) - Himself
 A Social Celebrity (1926) - Johann Haber
 The Wilderness Woman (1926) - 'Kodiak' MacLean
 Say It Again (1926) - Prince Otto V
 The Duchess of Buffalo (1926) - Hotel Manager
 The Nervous Wreck (1926) - Mort
 Midnight Lovers (1926) - Moriarity
 The Lady of the Harem (1926) - Ali
 We're in the Navy Now (1926) - Navy Capt. Smithers
 McFadden's Flats (1927) - Jock McTavish
 A Kiss in a Taxi (1927) - Maraval
 Cabaret (1927) - Jerry Trask
 Rubber Heels (1927) - Tennyson Hawks
 Tell It to Sweeney (1927) - Luke Beamish
 Two Flaming Youths (1927) - Sheriff Ben Holden
 Gentlemen Prefer Blondes (1928) - Judge
 Tillie's Punctured Romance (1928) - Circus Owner
 The Big Noise (1928) - John Sloval
 Fools for Luck (1928) - Samuel Hunter
 Beau Broadway (1928)
 Varsity (1928) - Pop Conlan
 The Haunted House (1928) - Mr. Rackham
 Taxi 13 (1928) - Angus Mactavish
 Marquis Preferred (1929) - Mr. Gruger
 Sunset Pass (1929) - Windy
 House of Horror (1929) - Chester
 The Studio Murder Mystery (1929) - George (Studio Gateman)
 Stairs of Sand (1929) - Tim
 Fast Company (1929) - Chamber of Commerce President
 The Virginian (1929) - Uncle "Pa" Hughey
 The Show of Shows (1929) - Traffic Cop in 'Bicycle Built for Two' Number
 Swing High (1930) - Sheriff
 The Love Trader (1930) - Nelson
 The Master Sweeper (1930)
 Her Majesty, Love (1931) - Emil
 Hallelujah, I'm a Bum (1933) - Sunday
 The Big Broadcast of 1936 (1935) - Sewer Worker (uncredited)
 Modern Times (1936) - Mechanic
 The Preview Murder Mystery (1936) - Comedian
 Call of the Prairie (1936) - Sheriff Sandy McQueen
 Hotel Haywire (1937) - O'Shea (uncredited)
 Forlorn River (1937) - Sheriff Alec Grundy
 Every Day's a Holiday (1937) - Cabby
 Zenobia (1939) - Farmer (uncredited)
 The Spellbinder (1939) - Courtroom Extra (uncredited)
 Hollywood Cavalcade (1939) - Sheriff
 Mr. Smith Goes to Washington (1939) - Man in Press Section of Senate Gallery (uncredited)
 Chip of the Flying U (1939) - Joe (uncredited)
 Henry Goes Arizona (1939) - Bus Driver (uncredited)
 The Great Dictator (1940) - Barber's Customer
 Li'l Abner (1940) - Mayor Gurgle
 Sweetheart of the Campus (1941) - The Prisoner-Vagrant (uncredited)
 Here Comes Mr. Jordan (1941) - Newsboy (uncredited)
 Harmon of Michigan (1941) - Gasoline Chuck
 One Foot in Heaven (1941) - Man Crying During Baptism (uncredited)
 Jesse James at Bay (1941) - Town Drunk (uncredited)
 Sullivan's Travels (1941) - Old Bum (uncredited)
 Honolulu Lu (1941) - Joe - Keystone Kop (uncredited)
 Valley of the Sun (1942) - Soldier at Hitching Rail (uncredited)
 The Remarkable Andrew (1942) - Shopkeeper (uncredited)
 Romance on the Range (1942) - Lynch Mob Member (uncredited)
 In Old California (1942) - Town Drunk (uncredited)
 Sons of the Pioneers (1942) - Old-Timer
 The Palm Beach Story (1942) - Sixth Member Ale and Quail Club
 I Married a Witch (1942) - Party Bartender (uncredited)
 Mrs. Wiggs of the Cabbage Patch (1942) - Drunk (uncredited)
 X Marks the Spot (1942) - Vagrant (uncredited)
 Hangmen Also Die! (1943) - Cook (uncredited)
 Sagebrush Law (1943) - Horse Owner (uncredited)
 The Avenging Rider (1943) - Town Drunk (uncredited)
 Riders of the Rio Grande (1943) - Barfly (uncredited)
 So This Is Washington (1943) - Inventor with Pocket Machine Gun (uncredited)
 Sweet Rosie O'Grady (1943) - Customer at Flugelman's (uncredited)
 My Kingdom for a Cook (1943) - Taxicab Driver (uncredited)
 Around the World (1943) - Waiter (uncredited)
 The Miracle of Morgan's Creek (1943)  - Pete (uncredited)
 Knickerbocker Holiday (1944) - Town Trumpeter (uncredited)
 The Adventures of Mark Twain (1944) - Frog-Jumping Contest Judge (uncredited)
 Man from Frisco (1944) - Baggage Man (uncredited)
 Goodnight, Sweetheart (1944) - Bottle Man
 The Yellow Rose of Texas (1944) - Drunken Gambler (uncredited)
 A Fig Leaf for Eve (1944) - Waiter
 The Great Moment (1944) - Frightened Patient (uncredited)
 Hail the Conquering Hero (1944) - Western Union Man (uncredited)
 Something for the Boys (1944) - Minor Role (uncredited)
 Sunday Dinner for a Soldier (1944) - Photographer (uncredited)
 Can't Help Singing (1944) - Poker Player (uncredited)
 Betrayal from the East (1945) - (uncredited)
 A Guy, a Gal and a Pal (1945) - Station Owner (uncredited)
 Brewster's Millions (1945) - Stage Doorman (uncredited)
 Having Wonderful Crime (1945) - Motel Proprietor (uncredited)
 The Great John L. (1945) - Haggerty (uncredited)
 Road to Utopia (1945) - Amateur Contestant Banjo Player (uncredited)
 Little Giant (1946) - Hotel Valet (uncredited)
 Smooth as Silk (1946) - Doorman (uncredited)
 Fear (1946) - Railroad Switchman (uncredited)
 The Hoodlum Saint (1946) - Cop (uncredited)
 Two Sisters from Boston (1946) - Street Cleaner (uncredited)
 She Wrote the Book (1946) - Man at Bar (uncredited)
 Singin' in the Corn (1946) - Austin Driver
 Song of Scheherazade (1947) -  Sailor (uncredited)
 Song of the Wasteland (1947) - The Jailer
 The Trouble with Women (1947) - Comedian (uncredited)
 The Perils of Pauline (1947) - Comic Chef
 Springtime in the Sierras (1947) - Old-Timer
 Jesse James Rides Again (1947, Serial) - Roy (uncredited)
 The Son of Rusty (1947) - Bakery Clerk (uncredited)
 Merton of the Movies (1947) - Keystone Kop (uncredited)
 My Wild Irish Rose (1947) - Man Escorted Out of Theatre by Police (uncredited)
 The Wreck of the Hesperus (1948) - Hostler (uncredited)
 Isn't It Romantic? (1948) - Townsman (uncredited)
 One Sunday Afternoon (1948) - Clerk (uncredited)
 Knock on Any Door (1949) - Barber (uncredited)
 Tulsa (1949) - Gambling Casino Patron (uncredited)
 The Beautiful Blonde from Bashful Bend (1949) - Messenger Boy
 Brimstone (1949) - Drunk (uncredited)
 Jiggs and Maggie in Jackpot Jitters (1949) - Jiggs' Friend (uncredited)
 My Friend Irma (1949) - Gypsy Tea Room Waiter (uncredited)
 The Golden Stallion (1949) - Old Man
 The Good Humor Man (1950) - Bush-Cutting Gardener (uncredited)
 Joe Palooka in Humphrey Takes a Chance (1950) - Prentice
 Fancy Pants (1950) - Guest (uncredited)
 Never a Dull Moment (1950) - Albert (uncredited)
 Shakedown (1950) - Chet (uncredited)
 Right Cross (1950) - Haggerty's Waiter (uncredited)
 The Milkman (1950) - Man (uncredited)
 Let's Dance (1950) - Watchman (uncredited)
 My Favorite Spy (1951) - Short Comic (uncredited)
 Son of Paleface (1952) - 2nd Bartender (uncredited)
 Doc Corkle (1952, TV Series)
 Private Hell 36 (1954) - Murdered Man in Elevator (uncredited)
 The Beast with a Million Eyes (1955) - Ben Webber
 Apache Woman (1955) - Dick Mooney
 Rock-A-Bye Baby (1958) - Bit Role (uncredited)
 Paradise Alley (1962) - Mr. Gregory
 A Big Hand for the Little Lady (1966) - Old Man in Saloon (final film)

References

External links

Chester Conklin at Virtual History

1886 births
1971 deaths
Male actors from Iowa
American male film actors
American male silent film actors
People from Oskaloosa, Iowa
Silent film comedians
Vaudeville performers
American circus performers
20th-century American male actors
20th-century American comedians
American male comedy actors